Margaret Early (December 25, 1919 – November 29, 2000) was an American film actress who was active in Hollywood during the 1930s and 1940s. She is best remembered for her endearing Southern charm.

Life and career

Born on Christmas Day 1919 into a devout Baptist family, she grew up on a farm near Birmingham, Alabama. During her youth, she often appeared in religious plays at her church, particularly in Christmas pageants. She came to Hollywood with her father on a business trip, and was asked to try out for a role in a Beverly Hills Little Theatre production where Gregory La Cava saw her perform. Eventually, she was signed with RKO. Her Southern accent was called "as sweet and thick as cream," in a column by Donald Kirkley for The Baltimore Sun.

Her first screen role came in Stage Door (1937) opposite Katharine Hepburn, Ginger Rogers, and Adolphe Menjou. Her next role came at Warner Bros. Studios playing Spring Byington's daughter in Jezebel (1938) opposite the likes of George Brent, Bette Davis, and Fay Bainter. She later became a freelance actress and found herself working in various roles at such studios as RKO, Warner Bros., and Metro-Goldwyn-Mayer. Her other screen roles include parts in Judge Hardy and Son (1939), Strike Up The Band (1940), Andy Hardy's Private Secretary (1941), and Stage Door Canteen (1943). She made her last screen appearance in Cinderella Jones (1946). She spent the remainder of her days living in Laguna Beach, California, being active in the Baptist church and the Republican party. She was good friends with Cheryl Walker, Mickey Rooney, Bette Davis, Ginger Rogers, Katharine Hepburn, Laraine Day, Henry Fonda, Cary Grant, Joel McCrea, and Dennis Morgan.

Death
On November 29, 2000, Margaret Early died at her home in Laguna Beach, California, from congestive heart failure at age 80. She is interred at Pacific View Memorial Park, Bayview Terrace, Lot 9F, in Corona del Mar, California.

Filmography
 Stage Door (1937)
 Jezebel (1938) as Stephanie Kendrick
 The Young in Heart (1938)
 Swing That Cheer (1938)
 Judge Hardy and Son (1939)
 Forty Little Mothers (1940)
 Strike Up the Band (1940)
 Andy Hardy's Private Secretary (1941)
 Small Town Deb (1941)
 To the Shores of Tripoli (1942)
 Stage Door Canteen (1943)
 Three Is a Family (1944)
 Cinderella Jones (1946)

References

External links

 

1919 births
2000 deaths
Actresses from Birmingham, Alabama
Southern Baptists
20th-century American actresses
20th-century American memoirists
People from Laguna Beach, California
Alabama Republicans
American film actresses
Burials at Pacific View Memorial Park
California Republicans
American stage actresses
American women memoirists
20th-century American women writers
Baptists from Alabama
20th-century Baptists